Jat Min Chuen is a public housing estate in Sha Tin Wai, Sha Tin, New Territories, Hong Kong. It is the only estate in Sha Tin developed by the Hong Kong Housing Society. It consists of three residential buildings completed in 1981 and 1982.

Background
The estate was named for Mr. Tan Jat Min, the former honorary treasurer of the Society and was the largest estate of the Housing Society at the time.

Unlike other estates, the Hong Kong Housing Society financed the construct of Jat Min Chuen using a bank loan at a high interest rate, rather than from the Government. Therefore, the rent in the estate was forced to be put up as the Society needed to return money to banks afterwards.

Houses

Demographics
According to the 2016 by-census, Jat Min Chuen had a population of 9,577. The median age was 51.1 and the majority of residents (98.2 per cent) were of Chinese ethnicity. The average household size was 2.6 people. The median monthly household income of all households (i.e. including both economically active and inactive households) was HK$23,000.

Politics
Jat Min Chuen is located in Jat Chuen constituency of the Sha Tin District Council. It is currently represented by Yau Man-chun, who was elected in the 2019 elections.

See also

Public housing estates in Sha Tin

References

Sha Tin
Residential buildings completed in 1981
Residential buildings completed in 1982
Public housing estates in Hong Kong
1981 establishments in Hong Kong
1982 establishments in Hong Kong